Sodium borate is a generic name for any salt of sodium with an anion consisting of boron and oxygen, and possibly hydrogen, or any hydrate thereof. It can be seen as a hydrated sodium salt of the appropriate boroxy acid, although the latter may not be a stable compound.

Many sodium borates have important industrial and household applications; the best known being borax,  = .

The ternary phase diagram of the –– phase diagram in the 0–100 °C temperature range contains 13 unique hydrated crystalline sodium borates, including five important industrial products.

Sodium borates, as well as boroxy acids, are often described as mixtures  = , with x, y, and z chosen to fit the elemental formula, or a multiple thereof.  Thus, for example, borax  would be , and boric acid  would be  = .

The elemental formula was often intrepreted as a z-hydrate of an "anhydrous" salt without any hydrogen, namely . However, later research uncovered that many borates have hydroxyl groups  bound covalently to the boron atoms in the anion.

The following table gives some of the crystalline sodium borates in this family.

Some of the borates above may have more than one isomeric or crystalline form. Some may decompose when dissolved in water.  Note that the anion of the "anhydrous borax" is different from that of its "hydrates".

Some of the anhydrous borates above can be crystallized from molten mixtured of sodium oxide and boric oxide.

Some sodium borates hower cannot be analyzed as combinations  of the three ordinary oxides. The most important example is sodium perborate, originally described as  but actually . The anion of this compound has two peroxide bridges  which make it oxygen-rich compared to the general family above.

References

sodium compounds
borates